Group A of the men's football tournament at the 2020 Summer Olympics was played from 22 to 28 July 2021 in Chōfu's Tokyo Stadium, Saitama's Saitama Stadium, Sapporo's Sapporo Dome and Yokohama's International Stadium Yokohama. The group consisted of France, host nation Japan, Mexico and South Africa. The top two teams, Japan and Mexico, advanced to the knockout stage.

Teams

Standings

In the quarter-finals,
The winners of Group A, Japan, advanced to play the runners-up of Group B, New Zealand.
The runners-up of Group A, Mexico, advanced to play the winners of Group B, South Korea.

Matches

Mexico vs France

Japan vs South Africa

France vs South Africa

Japan vs Mexico

France vs Japan

South Africa vs Mexico

Discipline
Fair play points would have been used as a tiebreaker if the overall and head-to-head records of teams were tied. These were calculated based on yellow and red cards received in all group matches as follows:
first yellow card: minus 1 point;
indirect red card (second yellow card): minus 3 points;
direct red card: minus 4 points;
yellow card and direct red card: minus 5 points;

Only one of the above deductions is applied to a player in a single match.

References

External links
Men's Olympic Football Tournament Tokyo 2020, FIFA.com

Group A